Altaf Hossain may refer to:
 Md. Altaf Hossain, Bangladeshi academic
 Altaf Hossain (politician)